Path of Fire is the third studio album by the Swedish band Aeon. It was released on 21/24 May in Europe and 25 May in the U.S. via Metal Blade Records.

Background 
As former bassist Max Carlberg had left Aeon at the time of the album recording and studio sessions had already been booked, preventing replacement bassist Victor Brandt from learning the songs in time, the bass on Path of Fire is handled by Aeon's guitarists Zeb Nilsson and Daniel Dlimi.

Guitarist and the graphic artist of Aeon, Daniel Dlimi, commented the cover art: "I created this symbol/badge that for me reflects life, death and the path you have chosen to live your life by. It's about whatever you want to chain yourself to 10 commandments or live free after your own conscience and will."

On 19 April Aeon posted "Kill Them All" for streaming online and Nilsson commented: "This is kind of funny, 'cause I actually dreamt that we were performing this song live and it sounded so cool that I had to start working on it the day after I had the dream. Of course, all the details in it were not in my dream, but the whole concept and idea behind how it was gonna sound was all very realistic. This is a very fast song and it is easy to catch I think. It has some really heavy parts too, and the leads on it ended up really cool too. I think this song will be a good first sample of this album!"

In June, Aeon released a music video for "Forgiveness Denied".

Track listing

Personnel 

Aeon
 Tommy Dahlström – vocals
 Zeb Nilsson – lead guitar, backing vocals, bass
 Daniel Dlimi – rhythm guitar, bass
 Nils Fjellström – drums

Production
 Producer – Aeon
 Recorded at Empire Studio in Östersund, Sweden; September 2009
 Mixing – Erik Rutan; Mana Recording Studios in St, Petersburg, Florida
 Mastering – Alan Douches; West West Side Music in New Windsor, New York
 Cover artwork and layout – Daniel Dlimi
 Photo – Jennie Grinde

References

External links
 , official Metal Blade Records YouTube channel

2010 albums
Aeon (band) albums
Metal Blade Records albums